Zachary Nugent Brooke  (1 December 1883 – 2 October 1946) was a British medieval historian.

Life
Born on 1 December 1883, Brooke was educated at Bradfield College in Berkshire and St John's College, Cambridge. In 1908, he was elected to a Drosier Fellowship at Gonville and Caius College, University of Cambridge. He was appointed as the second Professor of Medieval History at Cambridge in 1944. He was appointed as a Fellow of the British Academy in 1940.

Brooke is buried at the Parish of the Ascension Burial Ground, off Huntingdon Road, Cambridge, with his wife Rosa Grace Brooke (1888-1964).

He was the father of Christopher N. L. Brooke, who was also a medieval historian and fellow of Gonville and Caius College.

He died on 7 October 1946.

Works
His published works include:

The English Church and the Papacy: From the Conquest to the Reign of John (Cambridge University Press)
A History of Europe from 911 to 1198 (History of medieval and modern Europe;vol.2) (Methuen)

References

External links
Research papers of Zachary Nugent Brooke from Cambridge University

1883 births
1946 deaths
British medievalists
People educated at Bradfield College
Alumni of St John's College, Cambridge
Fellows of Gonville and Caius College, Cambridge
Fellows of the British Academy
Professors of Medieval History (Cambridge)
20th-century British historians